Daniil Igorevich Martovoy (born 20 April 2003) is a Russian football player. He plays for FC Rodina Moscow on loan from PFC Sochi.

Club career
On 26 June 2022, Martovoy returned to his youth club PFC Sochi after 1.5 years away. He made his debut in the Russian Premier League for Sochi on 26 August 2022 against FC Khimki.

On 21 February 2023, Martovoy moved to FC Rodina Moscow on a year-long loan with an option to buy.

Career statistics

References

External links
 
 
 
 

2003 births
Sportspeople from Krasnodar
Living people
Russian footballers
Association football midfielders
PFC Sochi players
Russian Second League players
Russian Premier League players